Derio is a town and municipality located in the province of Biscay, in the autonomous community of Basque Country, northern Spain. It is part of Greater Bilbao and was part of the municipality of Bilbao until 1983 and hosts Bilbao's biggest municipal cemetery. It has a population of 5,107 (2006).

The flag of Derio is similar to Quebec's flag.

Notable People 
 Miren Basaras (Spanish microbiologist)

References

External links
 DERIO in the Bernardo Estornés Lasa - Auñamendi Encyclopedia (Euskomedia Fundazioa) 

Municipalities in Biscay